Jeungsan Station is a railway station on Line 6 of the Seoul Subway. Its alternative name is Myongji University Station due to the proximity to Myongji University.

Station layout

Exits
 Exit 2: Bukgajwa Elementary School
 Exit 3: Jeungsan Elementary & Middle Schools
 Exit 4: Yeonseo Middle School

References

Metro stations in Eunpyeong District
Seoul Metropolitan Subway stations
Railway stations opened in 2000